Friedl Behn-Grund (26 August 1906 – 2 August 1989) was a German cinematographer.

Selected filmography

References

External links

1906 births
1989 deaths
German cinematographers
People from Połczyn-Zdrój
People from the Province of Pomerania